Redbone Community House is a historic clubhouse building in Barnesville, Georgia. It was added to the National Register of Historic Places on April 9, 1998. It is located at Community House Road at the junction with Sappington Road.

It was a Works Project Administration project.

See also
National Register of Historic Places listings in Lamar County, Georgia

References

Clubhouses on the National Register of Historic Places in Georgia (U.S. state)
Buildings and structures in Lamar County, Georgia
National Register of Historic Places in Lamar County, Georgia